Gary Rafael Hill (born April 21, 1989), professionally known as DJ Spinz, is an American record producer, songwriter and disc jockey. Spinz became a DJ in the late 2000s before turning into a record producer as well. He has produced hits for other artists such as Future, Ty Dolla Sign, Rich Homie Quan, iLoveMakonnen, French Montana, Cash Out, Travis Porter, Rick Ross, 2 Chainz & more.

Early life
Hill was born April 21, 1989, and grew up in Augusta, Georgia. Spinz's grandmother and uncle ran a supper club and he knew the DJ there since he was three or four years old. Spinz used to watch him DJ, so it really inspired him. When Spinz was fourteen, his mother bought him his first turntables. The local radio station in Augusta would broadcast high school football games and Spinz made a good impression on the station's program director. Spinz started deejaying during the commercials breaks of the games. When Spinz was sixteen, he met DJ Scream when he went to Atlanta to a Guitar Center to buy some cables for his equipment. When he was sixteen, the program director gave Spinz his own radio spot. At the time everyone around him wanted to be a basketball player or a rapper, but deejaying stuck out to him and he wanted to be able to control the crowd. At eighteen, Hill moved away from Augusta.

Career
Right after Spinz met DJ Scream, they worked together at Sirius XM Holdings and Spinz was signed to Hoodrich Entertainment. In 2009, Spinz shared an evening spot on Atlanta's Hot 107.9′s Hoodrich Radio. Around the time he started 107.9, Spinz started going into production. He picked up a keyboard and tried to make beats but struggled a couple of times and was sometimes at a point where he wanted to give up, but kept trying to perfect his skills. In 2010, Spinz produced the breakout single for Travis Porter, called "Go Shorty, Go". The fame of the song encouraged Spinz to want to keep going into production. In 2011, Spinz produced 2 Chainz', "Riot". Later in the year, Spinz also produced Ca$h Out's debut single, "Cashin' Out" and Ca$h Out wasn't signed to a label at the time. Spinz is also a mixtape DJ. Spinz and his partner DJ Pretty Boy Tank, have been working on the Space Invaders mixtape series since 2006.  His productions have the tag "Cut it up!" voiced by his little brother.

Discography

Extended plays
Trips (2015)

Mixtapes
Heart of the City 6 (2009)
Trench Atlanta (2009)
Everything Based (2010) (with Lil B) 
HPG (2012)
HPG 2 (2013)
HPG 3 (2013)

Production discography

Singles produced

Other songs

DJ Spinz 808 
The DJ Spinz 808 also known as the "Spinz 808" or "TCE Spinz 808" is a variation of a Roland TR-808 bass drum, which is credited to and named after Hill. The sound which has seen use in hip-hop, pop, and R&B, is famous for being one of the most popular and Iconic sounds in trap music. Originally created in 2011, the sample became very popular with trap producers due to its great low end presence, as well as good punch. It has spawned countless variations of its own, each with varying levels of Distortion, Equalization, and other changes. The sample is used when pitched to a low octave to act as a bass in trap beats. The "Spinz 808" has seen use from the some of the world's most popular producers such as Metro Boomin, Pi'erre Bourne, 808 Mafia, and Wheezy. It has been featured as the bass in countless songs, a notable example being the 2019 hit "Old Town Road" by Lil Nas X which reached #1 on the Billboard Hot 100 and remained at #1 for a record 19 weeks.

Notes

References

1989 births
Living people
African-American record producers
American hip hop DJs
American hip hop record producers
Musicians from Atlanta
Southern hip hop musicians
Trap musicians
Musicians from Augusta, Georgia
21st-century African-American people
20th-century African-American people